Lucas Hernan Villalba (born 19 August 1994) is an Argentine professional footballer who plays as a left-back for Argentinos Juniors in the Argentine Primera División.

Career

Club
Villalba started his career with Independiente, making his debut in the 2012–13 Argentine Primera División season against Godoy Cruz. He then moved to Atlético Tucumán in 2016 on loan and subsequently played 22 times in the Argentine Primera División. On 10 January 2017, Villalba joined fellow Primera División side Huracán on loan.

International
Villalba has won caps for Argentina at U20 level.

Career statistics

Club
.

References

1994 births
Living people
Footballers from Buenos Aires
Argentine footballers
Argentina youth international footballers
Argentine Primera División players
Primera Nacional players
Club Atlético Independiente footballers
Atlético Tucumán footballers
Club Atlético Huracán footballers
Aldosivi footballers
Argentinos Juniors footballers
Association football defenders